Dewey's Bakery is an American retail bakery offering fresh baked goods including custom cakes, Moravian cookies, cheese straws, artisan cheese biscuits.  Dewey's Bakery originated in Winston-Salem, North Carolina in 1930.  The company's classic Moravian Cookies are known to many as “the world’s thinnest cookie," and were selected by O: The Oprah Magazine to be featured on the coveted "O List."

History 

Since opening in 1930, Dewey's has been baking traditional favorites, such as Moravian Sugar Cake, Grandma and Grandpa Coffee Cakes, Moravian Lovefeast Buns, and Moravian Cookies. They are faithful to the origins of these time-honored classics, which are still made in the homemade tradition with a centuries-old recipe from the ancient region of Moravia, located in what is now the Czech Republic.  

In 1992 Dewey's Bakery expanded, creating Salem Baking Company to focus on national distribution of their Moravian Spice Cookies. Since then, Salem Baking has added additional artisan products including Classic Southern Style Cheese Straws and Cheese Straw Petites, Cheese Biscuits, and Shortbread Cookies.

List of Moravian Cookie flavors 
 Ginger Spice
 Classic Sugar
 Meyer Lemon
Salted Caramel
 Key Lime
 Tangerine Orange
 Pumpkin Spice
 Maple & Brown Sugar
 Spiced Apple Cider
 Cranberry Orange
 Brownie Crisp Chocolate
 Vanilla Walnut
 Dark Chocolate Dipped Ginger Spice
 Milk Chocolate Dipped Classic Sugar
 Dark Chocolate Dipped Sugar with Mint

References

External links 
 Dewey's official website
 Salem Baking Company's official website

Food and drink companies established in 1930
Bakeries of the United States
Bakery cafés
Companies based in Winston-Salem, North Carolina
Moravian settlement in North Carolina
1930 establishments in North Carolina